Bench (Bencnon, Shenon or Mernon, formerly called Gimira ) is a Northern Omotic language of the "Gimojan" subgroup, spoken by about 174,000 people (in 1998) in the Bench Maji Zone of the Southern Nations, Nationalities, and Peoples Region, in southern Ethiopia, around the towns of Mizan Teferi and Shewa Gimira. In a 2006 dissertation, Christian Rapold described three varieties of Bench (Benchnon, Shenon, and Mernon) as "...mutually intelligible...varieties of one and the same language". Bench is the ancestral language of the Bench people.

In unusual variance from most of the other languages in Africa, Bench has retroflex consonant phonemes. The language is also noteworthy in that it has six phonemic tones, one of only a handful of languages in the world that have this many. Bench has a whistled form used primarily by male speakers, which permits communication over greater distances than spoken Bench. The whistle can be created using the lips or made from a hollow created with both hands. Additionally, this form of the language may be communicated via the 5-stringed krar.

Phonology

There are six phonemic tones: five level tones (numbered 1 to 5 in the literature, with 1 being the lowest) and one rising tone 23 . The top tone is sometimes realized as a high rising 45 . On the vowel o, they are 

The consonants are:

All of these can occur palatalized, but only before , suggesting an alternate analysis of a sixth phonemic vowel .

The syllable structure is (C)V(C)(C)(C) + tone or (C) N (C), where C represents any consonant, V any vowel, N any nasal, and brackets an optional element.

Grammar

Nouns

Plurals may optionally be formed by adding the suffix ; however, these are rarely used except with definite nouns.  E.g.:  "her relatives";  "all the people".

Pronouns

Personal pronouns

The word  goes slightly beyond being a reflexive pronoun; it can mark any third person that refers to the subject of the sentence, e.g.:

{|
||||||| 
|-
|he.S||own||sheep||sell.he.Fin
|}
"he sold his (own) sheep"

{|
||||||||| 
|-
|road.||go.self||self.be...when||leopard-NPMk||big||see.he.Fin
|}
"when he was going along the road, he saw a big leopard"

The oblique form is basic, and serves as object, possessive, and adverbial.  The subject form has three variants: normal (given above), emphatic - used when the subject is particularly prominent in the sentence, especially sentence-initially - and reduced, used as part of a verb phrase.  The "locative" term means "to, at, or for one's own place or house", e.g.:

{|
||||||| 
|-
|return.I||to.my.house||I||go.I.Fin
|}
"I went home"

Determiners
The main determiners are "that, the" (masc. , fem. , pl. ) and "this" (masc. , fem. , pl. ).  As suffixes on a verb or an ablative or locative phrase, they indicate a relative clause. E.g.:

{|
||||||||| 
|-
|person..NPMk||these.O||what.||separate||make..Intl?
|}
"how can I separate these people?"

{|
||||| 
|-
|woman||house.||be.that
|}
"the woman who is in the house"

Demonstratives
The demonstratives include  "here",  "there (nearby)",  "there (far away)",  "down there",  "up there".  Alone, or with the determiner suffixes  or  added, these function as demonstrative pronouns "this person", "that person", etc.  With the noun phrase marker , they become demonstrative adjectives.  E.g.:

{|
||||||| 
|-
|here||man||near||reach...when
|}
"when he came near to the man..."

{|
||||| 
|-
|boy.NPMk||down.there.NPMk||.S
|}
"these boys down there"

Numbers
The numbers are:

20, 30, etc. are formed by adding  "ten" (with tone change) to the unit.  In compound numbers,  is added to each 'figure, thus:

13 
236 

When a cardinal number functions as an adjective, the suffix  can be added (e.g.  "three children").  Ordinal numbers are formed by suffixing  to the cardinal, e.g.:  "fourth".

Adjectives
Adjectives are sometimes intensified by changing the tone to top; e.g.  "big" →  "very big".

Verbs
Verbs with monosyllabic roots can have three different forms of their active stems: the singular imperative, which is just the root; the past stem, usually identical to the root but sometimes formed by adding -k (with changes to the preceding consonant); and the future stem, usually identical to the root but sometimes formed by changing the tone from mid 3 to high 4 or from bottom 1 to top 5.

Compound verbs are formed with  "say" or  "cause to say", a formation common among Ethiopian languages.

The primary tenses are simple past (formed from the past stem), future (future stem plus ), present perfect (from present participle stem); negative (future stem plus .)  E.g.:  →  "he went";  "he will go";  "he has gone".

The order of affixes is: root-(tense)-(negative)-(foc. pn.)-person/number-marker.

Orthography and literature

A Latin-based orthography was adopted in 2008. Previously, the New Testament had been published in the Bench language using an orthography based on the Ethiopian syllabary.  Tones were not indicated. Retroflex consonants were indicated by such techniques as using extra symbols from the syllabary (the "nigus s") and forming new symbols (the addition of an extra arm on the left side for "t").

Notes

References
Breeze, Mary J. 1986. "Personal pronouns in Gimira (Benchnon)."  In Ursula Wiesemann (ed.), Pronominal systems, 47–69. Tübingen: Gunter Narr.
Breeze, Mary J. 1988. "Phonological features of Gimira and Dizi."  In Marianne Bechhaus-Gerst and Fritz Serzisko (eds.), Cushitic - Omotic: papers from the International Symposium on Cushitic and Omotic languages, Cologne, January 6–9, 1986, 473–487. Hamburg: Helmut Buske Verlag.
Breeze, Mary J. 1990. "A Sketch of the Phonology and Grammar of Gimira (Benchnon)". In Richard J. Hayward (ed.), Omotic Language Studies, 1-67. London: School of Oriental and African Studies, University of London.
Rapold, Christian.  2006.  Towards a Grammar of Benchnon. Dissertation, Leiden University.
Wedekind, Klaus. 1983. "A six-tone language in Ethiopia: Tonal analysis of Benč non (Gimira)."  Journal of Ethiopian Studies 16: 129–56.
Wedekind, Klaus. 1985a. "Why Bench’ (Ethiopia) has five level tones today."  In Ursula Pieper and Gerhard Stickel (eds.), Studia linguistica diachronica et synchronica, 881-901. Berlin: Mouton.
Wedekind, Klaus. 1985b. "Thoughts when drawing a map of tone languages."  Afrikanistische Arbeitspapiere 1: 105–24.
Wedekind, Klaus. 1990. "Gimo-Jan or Ben-Yem-Om: Benč - Yemsa phonemes, tones, and words."  In Richard J. Hayward (ed.), Omotic language studies p. 68-184. London: School of Oriental and African Studies, University of London.

External links
Rapold, Christian.  2006.  Towards a Grammar of Benchnon. Dissertation, Leiden University. (University webpage has a link to download a PDF of a Dutch summary.) https://www.universiteitleiden.nl/en/research/research-output/humanities/towards-a-grammar-of-benchnon
Wedekind, Klaus. 1983. A Six-Tone Language in Ethiopia
Wedekind, Klaus. 1985a. http://www.kwedekind.de///Eingang1///PdfFiles/1985_WhyBenchHasFiveLevelTonesToday.pdf
Wedekind, Klaus. 1985a. http://www.kwedekind.de///Eingang1///PdfFiles/1985_Thoughts_when_Drawing_a_Map_of_Tone_Languages.pdf
World Atlas of Language Structures information: http://wals.info/languoid/lect/wals_code_gim
Website maintained by the Bench community, on culture and language, in the Bench language

Languages of Ethiopia
North Omotic languages
Tonal languages
Whistled languages